B-Sides and Otherwise is a rarities compilation album by the alternative rock band Morphine, released in September 1997 by Rykodisc. It features B-Sides and other rare tracks not otherwise available on the band's studio albums.

Background
In 1996, when Morphine's record contract with Rykodisc was sold off to DreamWorks at the band's request, the band still owed Rykodisc two albums. An agreement was then made where Rykodisc obtained the exclusive rights to the two future archival releases B-Sides and Otherwise and 2000's Bootleg Detroit.

Band leader Mark Sandman had originally wanted the compilation to be called Besides, but when informed that label mates Sugar had released a B-sides collection of the same name, Sandman subsequently came up with B-Sides and Otherwise.

Critical reception
In a lukewarm review, Pitchfork wrote that B-Sides and Otherwise shows the two sides of Morphine: "the creepy, grooving side ... and the boring, pretentious art rock-cum-beat poet masturbations that make up the bulk of this disc." Similarly, Trouser Press felt that there were only a few "truly effective numbers" on the compilation, "aside from the selections buzzing on free-form atmospherics that bring the trio uncomfortably close to skronky jazz." 

AllMusic described the album as "more challenging and abstract than your average Morphine release." They felt that some tracks, such as the eight-minute "soundscape" "Down Love's Tributaries," may test the listener's patience, while others are "thoroughly enjoyable." They concluded that it is "an interesting collection of oddities that will appeal to the dedicated fan," capturing the band "at their most experimental."

Track listing

Notes
Tracks 1-3 recorded live May 25, 1994, at Bullet Sound, Nederhorst den Berg, the Netherlands, for 2 Meter Sessies (NOS/VARA TV)

Personnel 
Adapted from the album liner notes.

Morphine
 Mark Sandman – vocals, 2-string slide bass, organ, guitar, knobs
 Dana Colley – baritone saxophone, tenor saxophone, soprano saxophone, autoharp, dobro feedback
 Billy Conway – drums

Additional musicians
 Mike Rivard – bass (4)
 Russ Gershon – tenor saxophone on (4, 5)
 Tom Halter – trumpet (5)
 Larry Dersch – drums (5)
 Jerome Deupree – drums (6)
 Sabine Hrechdakian – vocals (7)
 Frank Swart – bass (12)
 Dominique Zar – drums (12)
 Rick Barry – percussion (13)

Technical
Morphine – producer (1-3)
Mark Sandman – producer (4-7, 9, 10, 12, 13), engineer at Hi-N-Dry (4, 5, 7, 8, 10, 12, 13), cover design
Paul Q. Kolderie – producer (6, 9), engineer at Fort Apache (6, 9, 11) and The Outpost (6)
Han Nuyton – engineer at Bullet Sound (1-3)
Phil Davidson – mixing (1-3)

References

Morphine (band) albums
B-side compilation albums
1997 compilation albums
Rykodisc compilation albums